Multimedia, Inc. was a media company that owned 12 daily newspapers, 49 weekly newspapers, two radio stations, five television stations, and a cable television system division. The company was headquartered in Greenville, South Carolina.

History 
Multimedia's origins can be traced to December 1932, when the News-Piedmont Company of Greenville, which published the Greenville News and Greenville Piedmont newspapers, acquired radio station WFBC, only weeks after the station relocated to Greenville from Knoxville, Tennessee. In November 1953 the News-Piedmont Co. acquired majority ownership of the Asheville Citizen and Asheville Times and its wholly owned radio station, WWNC. WFBC-TV, the News and Piedmonts television station, signed on from Greenville at the end of 1953.

The News-Piedmont Co. would expand its broadcast holdings with the acquisitions of WBIR-AM-FM-TV in Knoxville in 1961, and of the Southeastern Broadcasting Company, which owned WMAZ-AM-FM-TV in Macon, Georgia, in 1963. Then, in September 1967 the three commonly owned companies were merged, taking on the Multimedia, Inc. name. At the time Multimedia consisted of the Asheville and Greenville newspapers, three television stations and seven radio stations.

The company's biggest purchases came in 1976, when it purchased several properties from Cincinnati-based Avco, which was liquidating its media holdings. Multimedia first bought Avco's flagship television station, WLWT in Cincinnati, and later acquired Avco Program Sales, the syndication division which produced and nationally distributed The Phil Donahue Show and a regionally-distributed program produced at WLWT, The Bob Braun Show. This division would be renamed Multimedia Program Sales.

The company was involved in one of the more unusual media transactions in history. In 1983, it sold its flagship television station, WFBC-TV in Greenville (now WYFF) and WXII-TV in Winston-Salem, North Carolina to Pulitzer, Inc. In return, Multimedia received Pulitzer's former flagship television station, KSDK in St. Louis. Multimedia used its new purchase as the testing ground for a new show hosted by Sally Jessy Raphael.

General Electric's NBC unit was considered to buy the company in 1995, but the deal never materialized.

On July 24, 1995, the Gannett Company announced that it had entered into an agreement to acquire Multimedia for $1.7 billion, plus $539 million in long-term debt. The merger was approved by the FCC in November 1995 and was completed a month later, on December 4.
and after the sale was finalized, in November 1996, Gannett sold Multimedia Entertainment to MCA subsidiary of Seagram. In January 2000 the cable television division, which included systems in Kansas, Oklahoma and North Carolina was sold to Cox Communications.  The North Carolina systems were resold to Suddenlink Communications in 2006.

The Multimedia name lives on as a holding company and licensee within what is now Tegna Inc.'s corporate structure. Productions under Multimedia Entertainment are now part of the NBCUniversal Television Distribution archives.

Former Multimedia-owned stations
Stations are listed in alphabetical order by state and city of license.

Television stations
Note: two boldface asterisks appearing following a station's call letters (**) indicate a station that was built and signed on by a predecessor company of Multimedia.Footnotes:'
1 Multimedia purchased only a simple majority (51 percent) stake in WKYC-TV from NBC in 1991. Gannett retained the same share until 1999, when it purchased the remaining portion (49 percent) from NBC.

Radio stations

References

Defunct broadcasting companies of the United States
Defunct mass media companies of the United States
Companies based in Greenville, South Carolina
Defunct companies based in South Carolina
Tegna Inc.
1968 establishments in South Carolina
1995 disestablishments in South Carolina
1995 mergers and acquisitions